Ubbeston is a village and civil parish in the East Suffolk district, in the county of Suffolk, England. Nearby settlements include the town of Halesworth, the village of Heveningham and the hamlet of Ubbeston Green.

External links

Ubbeston village website

Villages in Suffolk
Civil parishes in Suffolk
Suffolk Coastal